"Throw a Fit" is a song by American singer Tinashe. Produced by RCA Records, the song was released as a single for digital download and streaming on July 26, 2018. The song was the second single off Tinashe's now-scrapped fourth studio album Nashe. It is notably Tinashe's second highest streamed song on music platforms as of 2022.

Composition 
"Throw a Fit" is a song running for 2 minutes and 38 seconds. As described as Jon Stickler of Stereoboard.com, Tinashe introduces a "take-no-prisoners alter-ego, Nashe". The song follows a "slick-trap beat". Tinashe described "Nashe" who "has 0 chill, will steal your bitch, and doesn't give a hint of fuck".

Background and release 
On June 9, 2018, Hitmaka announced on Twitter he would be serving as an executive producer for Tinashe's upcoming album, Nashe. On the night of the single release, Tinashe introduced her alter-ego "Nashe" on a post from her Instagram story and Twitter.

Critical reception 
Mike Nied from Idolator called "Throw a Fit" a "brazen and brag-heavy anthem" and noted Tinashe's "divalicious attitude" in the song. Billboard's Sofia Mele described Tinashe's alter-ego "Nashe" as "an icy diva with attitude" and overall the song as a "bratty single", in reference to the alter-ego. Robyn Mowatt of Hypebae called "Throw a Fit" a song that Tinashe "flexes her bossy state of mind". James Rettig from Stereogum compares "Throw a Fit" and Tinashe's previous single "Like I Used To", "Where that ["Like I Used To"] song was a wistful remembrance of a past relationship, this one’s more of a flexing banger". In a HotNewHipHop review, the magazine rated the song with their rating of "VERY HOTTTTT", Alex Zidel praises Tinashe for "Not depending on anybody else's money to cop what she wants, Tinashe is singing all about her love of the finer things". Jesse James from SuperDope praises Tinashe, as she "shows off her vocal talents, doing so with a raunchy and contagious new effort" and "showing off her rap chops behind the mic as well."

Credits and personnel 
Adapted from Tidal.

Personnel
Songwriting – Gucci Mane, Smash David, Hitmaka, Jordan Holt-May, Polow da Don, Jaucquez Lowe, Melvin Moore, Jocelyn A. Donald, Racquelle Anteola, Mayila Caiemi Marie Jones
Production – Hitmaka, Smash David
Vocals – Tinashe

Charts

Release history

References 

2018 songs
RCA Records singles
Tinashe songs
Songs written by Tinashe
Songs written by Polow da Don
Songs written by Gucci Mane
2018 singles
Songs written by Hitmaka
Song recordings produced by Yung Berg
Songs written by Smash David
Trap music songs